Maksym Anatoliyovych Koval (born 9 December 1992) is a Ukrainian professional footballer who plays as a goalkeeper who plays for Sheriff Tiraspol.

Club career

FC Metalurh Zaporizhzhia

2009–10
Koval is a product of Metalurh Zaporizhzhia Youth school system. He first appeared on the bench for the first team on 26 July 2009. He was there for just 5 games before he was given his chance. Mainly due to the number of absentees, he appeared in goal for Round 12 of the Ukrainian Premier League on 1 November; He kept a clean sheet in a 3–0 win. After a fine performance, he kept his place for the next two games, keeping two more clean sheets in the process. Even when he did concede, it was only a single goal in a 1–1 draw with Dynamo Kyiv, a game in which he also saved a 94th minute penalty kick from Artem Milevskyi, saving the point. Metalurg's form rose, and he kept his place from then on. A 0–4 drubbing by Metalist was the only real blip on his seasons performance. He ended with 6 clean sheets and having only conceded 23 in 19 games.

Dynamo Kyiv

2010–11

After a fine debut season, starting whilst he was aged just 16, Dynamo Kyiv showed interest. This was intensified after a superb performance against them during the season. He signed for them just 3 games into the 2010–11 season.

He made his debut for Dynamo in a UEFA Champions League play-off game against AFC Ajax, and with an impressive performance subsequently established himself as the first-choice goalkeeper with his new club in the absence of the injured Oleksandr Shovkovskyi, at the age of only 17. When Shovkovskyi returned from injury in the second half of the 2010–2011 season, Koval was moved to the back-up goalkeeper position.

In November 2010, Koval was named by Spanish football magazine, Don Balón as one of the 100 best young players in the world alongside David de Gea, who had recently moved to Manchester United.

2011–12
He was a substitute goalkeeper throughout the 2011–2012 season, making just 5 appearances up until mid-late April. He kept clean sheets in 4 of them, and conceded 1 in a 6–1 thrashing of FC Zorya Luhansk in October. However, at the end of April, he got a breakthrough, and due to injury to Oleksandr Shovkovskyi (and injury that would rule him out of Euro 2012) he played in the final 3 matches. Coming on initially as a halftime substitute away at Volyn Lutsk, he kept a 5th clean sheet of the season. Next up was Zorya Luhansk again, an though there was not to be a thrashing on this occasion, Koval kept a 6th clean sheet in 7 appearances, and Dynamo drew 0–0. His final chance to impress was against Tavriya Simferopol on 10 May. The game started well with Dynamo taking the lead, only for Koval to rush from his line as the opposing player made a dash forward, and foul him just outside the box with a poor tackle. He was sent off for preventing a clear goal scoring opportunity.
In the 2011–12 season, he also made a single appearance in Ukrainian Cup (conceding 2 in a 3–2 win) and Europa League (conceding 3 in a 3–3 win).

2012–13
For the upcoming 2012–2013 season, it is widely thought that he will become the first choice keeper.
As of 22 August 2012, he has started in all 7 of Dynamo Kyiv's opening games. In the 4 league games he has conceded 2 goals in 4 games, keeping 2 clean sheets. In the champions league he conceded 1 in a 2–1 home win over Feyenoord, and kept a clean sheet in the surprise 1–0 away win. He then went on to concede just once and make a string of saves in a shock 3–1 away win over Borussia Mönchengladbach.

2014–15: loan to Hoverla Uzhhorod
On 6 August 2014, Koval was loaned out to Hoverla Uzhhorod until the end of 2014. On 3 March 2015, after participating in Dynamo's winter training camp, it was announced that Koval will return to Hoverla until the end of the season.

2015–16: loan to Odense Boldklub
On 30 August 2015, Koval was loaned out to Danish club Odense Boldklub for a season long loan.

2017–18: loan to Deportivo La Coruña
On 20 January 2018, Koval joined Spanish La Liga side Deportivo La Coruña on loan for the remainder of the season, in a deal that included a buyout option.

2018-19: loan to Al-Fateh
On 23 July 2018, it was announced that Koval will spend the upcoming  2018-19 season with the Saudi Professional League club Al-Fateh.

Al Fateh
At the end of the loan period, Al Fateh was able to buy Koval's transfer from Dynamo Kyiv and signed the goalkeeper to a three-year deal. He left the club following the expiration of his contract on 30 June 2022.

Sheriff Tiraspol
On 13 August 2022, Sheriff Tiraspol announced the signing of Koval.

International career
Koval was called up to the senior national team in June 2011 for matches against Uzbekistan and France, but did not play in any of these games. He finally made his debut on 1 June 2012, as a second-half substitute in the 2–3 loss against Austria in a friendly match. Koval was included in Ukraine's squad for the UEFA Euro 2012 tournament on home soil.

Career statistics

Club

Honours

Club
Dynamo Kyiv
Ukrainian Cup: 2013–14

Individual
Ukraine's best young (Under-21) football player (according to Golden talent of Ukraine): April 2013,  July 2013

References

External links
 Maxim Koval at Twitter
 
 

1992 births
Living people
Footballers from Zaporizhzhia
Ukrainian footballers
Ukraine international footballers
Ukraine under-21 international footballers
Ukraine youth international footballers
Ukrainian Premier League players
Danish Superliga players
La Liga players
FC Metalurh Zaporizhzhia players
FC Dynamo Kyiv players
FC Hoverla Uzhhorod players
Association football goalkeepers
UEFA Euro 2012 players
Odense Boldklub players
Deportivo de La Coruña players
Ukrainian expatriate footballers
Expatriate men's footballers in Denmark
Ukrainian expatriate sportspeople in Denmark
Expatriate footballers in Spain
Ukrainian expatriate sportspeople in Spain
Saudi Professional League players
Al-Fateh SC players
Expatriate footballers in Saudi Arabia
Ukrainian expatriate sportspeople in Saudi Arabia